Jai Bhim is a slogan that refers to B. R. Ambedkar.

Jai Bhim may also refer to:
 Jai Bhim (film)
 Jai Bhim Comrade, a film

See also 
 Ambedkar (disambiguation)